Second Flying Company of San Carlos de Parras, also known as the Álamo de Parras Company, were Spanish lancers from San José y Santiago del Álamo in Coahuila. Their 1803 occupation of the San Antonio de Valero Mission is reputed to be the reason the mission was renamed "the Alamo." The compañía volante (flying company) were mounted  militiamen active during the Viceroyalty of New Spain's occupation of Tejas (Texas). During the occupation, a military hospital was established and the mission's structure was expanded to facilitate its function as a military fortification.

The company surrendered their command of the mission during the 1813 Magee-Gutiérrez Expedition. Commandant Vizente Tarin left the company and joined Tejano federalists, in their fight for independence, fighting at the Battle of Medina. His son, Manuel Antonio Santiago Tarín, in later years enlisted in Juan Seguín's Tejano company and fought at the Battle of San Jacinto.

In 1830, the company under José Francisco Ruiz, built Fort Tenoxtitlán in Burleson County. The Álamo de Parras Company served as reinforcements for Martín Perfecto de Cos during the Siege of Béxar.

Notes

Footnotes

Citations

References

Texas Revolution